The Constantine Tramway is a tramway system which has been operating in Constantine, Algeria, since 2013. 

There had been several delays and cost over-runs in the construction of the tramway. Originally scheduled to enter revenue service in November 2011, the first section of 8.9 kilometres with 10 stations between the Ben-Abdelmalek-Ramdhan stadium and Zouaghi opened on 4 July 2013 with five additional stations added in 2019. Six more stations opened on 29 September 2021.

The tram system construction project was overseen by Pizzarotti, an Italian construction company. The tramway runs from the city’s old-town alongside the main historical Mosque, passes over the slope of the Oued Rhumel, and proceeds through the university area, ending in the modern part of the city.

See also 
 Constantine Cable Car
 Algiers tramway
 Oran Tramway
 Template:Suburban railways in Africa

References

External links 

 

Light rail in Algeria
Tram
Tram transport in Algeria
Public inquiries in Algeria
750 V DC railway electrification
Railway lines opened in 2013
RATP Group
2013 establishments in Algeria